Sylvester Murley Sturgeon (12 August 1886 — 1 May 1930) was an English first-class cricketer of Scottish-descent.

Sturgeon was born at Stoke Newington in August 1886. A club cricketer for Carlton, he made two appearances in first-class cricket for Scotland against Surrey at The Oval on Scotland's 1922 tour of England, and against Wales at Perth in 1923. Playing as a wicket-keeper in the Scottish side, the took five catches and made a single stumping. Sturgeon later became commercial traveller based in Redland, Bristol. He was summoned before Nailsworth Police Court in October 1929, having been found drunk while in charge of a motor vehicle, having reversed his car through a shop window; he was subsequently fined £3 plus £2 costs, and banned from driving for 12 months. Sturgeon died the following year, in May 1930 at the Boston Hotel in Chester.

References

External links
 

1886 births
1930 deaths
English people of Scottish descent
People from Stoke Newington
English cricketers
Scotland cricketers